Matt Kopec is an American politician from the state of Arizona. A member of the Democratic Party, Kopec served in the Arizona House of Representatives.

Career
The Pima County Board of Supervisors picked Kopec to replace Victoria Steele, who stepped down to focus on her congressional run.

Kopec was elected to the Governing Board of Amphitheater Public Schools in 2018.

References

External links
 Legislative Biography

Living people
Democratic Party members of the Arizona House of Representatives
Politicians from Tucson, Arizona
21st-century American politicians
Year of birth missing (living people)